Balancán (municipality) is a municipality in Tabasco in south-eastern Mexico. Its capital is the small town of Balancán de Domínguez.

References

Municipalities of Tabasco